The Eight Views of Ram City, also known as the Eight Sights of Guangzhou is the collective name for various collections of the eight most famous tourist attractions in Guangzhou, China, during different periods of its history. Collections of "Eight Views" is a common trope in Chinese travel literature.

Song dynasty
The Eight Sights of Guangzhou in the Song dynasty were recorded in the Annals of Nanhai County of the Kangxi Era and the Annals of Guangzhou Prefecture of the Qianlong Era. Most of the sights were closely related to water bodies in the city, reflecting its tight cultural connection to water.

 Fuxu Yuri referred to Yuri Pavilion in Fuxu Town, located in present-day Miaotou Village, Nangang Town to the east of Nanhai Temple. Yuri Pavilion used to overlook the Pearl River. At dawn, the sun could be seen rising amidst the waves of the river. The pavilion has survived till the modern days, but the riverside has retreated by hundreds of metres. Trees and buildings standing on the alluvial land now completely blocks the view of the river from the pavilion.
 Shimen Fanzhao was located at the intersection of a tributary of the Bei River with Liuxi River in present-day Shimen Village, Jianggao Town in Baiyun District. The surrounding mountains were reflected upon the river. The sun at dawn and dusk would add to the splendor of the sight. Occasionally, mirages could be seen above the water. Legend had it that the view of Shaozhou of hundreds of li away had been seen in a mirage.
 Haishan Xiaoji referred to Haishan Building. Located in present-day Beijing Lu, Haishan Building had an immediate view of the Pearl River thanks to the width of the river at its time. The sight disappeared in the Yuan dynasty as the building caught fire and collapsed.
 Zhujiang Qiuse was found near the intersection of present-day Yanjiang Xilu and Xindi 1 Henglu. In the Song dynasty, this segment of the Pearl River running through Guangzhou was still as wide as one kilometre. A round reef, Haizhu Reef, lay in the middle of the river. Tides would submerge and expose the reef every day. The river has since narrowed over the course of time. Haizhu Reef became buried underground inland in the 1930s.
 Juhu Yunying referred to Juhu Lake, a reservoir constructed by Lu Gou, Prefectural Governor of Guangzhou and Military Commissioner of Lingnan in 836 CE. The reservoir was decorated with pavilions and pagodas; cotton trees and erythrinas were planted along the blanks. It became a popular scenic spot for spring-time excursions of local residents. During the Five Dynasties and Ten Kingdoms period, the Southern Han dynasty established an imperial palace at the reservoir. The reservoir silted and dried up in the Yuan dynasty. Present-day Xiaobei Lu runs by the southeast of Yuexiu Mountain through the place where the reservoir was located.
 Pujian Lianquan was a creek on Baiyun Mountain. The name "Pujian" came from the calami growing in the creek. Creek water fell off a tall cliff and was blown into countless droplets by the mountain breeze. When it rained, the falling droplets became a waterfall, then a spring emerged and was called Lianquan Spring. The present-day Pujian Creek has changed its course, and calami are no longer found in it. The remains of the waterfall of Lianquan Spring can be found at the north end of Lianquan Lu.
 Guangxiao Puti referred to Guangxiao Temple. In 676, a revered monk named Zhiyao planted a pipal in the temple. The tree lived for more than  years until it was brought down by a typhoon in 1800. In 1802, a new tree was planted and was a descendant of the older tree, which can be found in the temple today.
 Datong Yanyu referred to Datong Temple and Yanyu Well in the temple. Yanyu Well was said to be capable of forecasting weather. When rain was about to fall, fog would rise from the well. The temple was reduced to debris during the occupation of Guangzhou by Japanese forces in the Second Sino-Japanese War. Located in Fangcun by the mouth of Huadi River, only several street names were left of the temple, and only one of those streets is still found today.

Yuan dynasty
The Eight Sights of Guangzhou in the Yuan dynasty retained four sights of those in the Song dynasty while adding four new ones. The four sights from the Song dynasty were all water-related; meanwhile, the four new ones were all mountain sights. All eight sights were found outside the city walls.

 Fuxu Yuri
 Shimen Fanzhao
 Datong Yanyu
 Pujian Lianquan
 Baiyun Wanwang referred to the view of the city of Guangzhou at dusk from Baiyun Temple on Baiyun Mountain. Baiyun Temple was located on the south side of Baiyun Mountain. In the Yuan dynasty, the city boundaries were still quite far away from Baiyun Mountain. Therefore, at Baiyun Temple, the view of the entire city could be seen and was particularly splendid at dusk. The location of the sight has now become a popular spot for moon sighting on the night of the Mid-Autumn Festival.
 Jingtai Senggui referred to Jingtai Temple on the north side of Baiyun Mountain. It was established by a famous monk named Jingtai in the Datong era of the reign of Emperor Wu of the Liang dynasty. The temple had since gradually become a popular tourist attraction. The sight was destroyed in the early Qing dynasty when the rebel armies of Shang Kexi and Geng Zhongming logged trees in the area for building cannons during their invasion of Guangzhou.
 Yuetai Qiuse referred to Yuexiu Mountain. Yuewang Platform was the earliest recreational spot in Guangzhou. Built during the Western Han dynasty, only the pedestal was left to be found in the Tang dynasty. The sight was then known for its natural landscape.
 Lingzhou Aofu referred to Mount Lingzhou located in present-day Guanyao Town, Nanhai District, Foshan to the northwest of Guangzhou. In the Yuan dynasty, the nearby Xinan and Lubao Streams had not silted. The mount was surrounded by vast water in all directions. Passengers travelling by the mount would climb it for a sightseeing trip of the mount itself as well as the Xi and Bei Rivers. The sight declined over the last 300 years as the surrounding water narrowed and transportation became inconvenient.

Ming dynasty
The Eight Sights of Guangzhou of the Ming dynasty were recorded in Transcripts of Ancient Manuscripts on Yangcheng, which quoted Annals of Ming as well as Continued Annals of Nanhai County, compiled in 1910. The list of this era saw a radical departure from that of the Song dynasty. As the city boundaries expanded, only sights located in the urban areas were selected.

 Yuexiu Songtao referred to Yuexiu Mountain.
 Suishi Dongtian was a red sandstone hillock. It had been an islet located in shallow seawater and developed numerous potholes due to corrosion. Two such potholes found on a big rock resembled the shape of a footprint and were believed to be trace left by an immortal, earning the rock a name "Xianren Muji". The scene is now part of Wuxian Temple. What used to be by the seaside during the Jin dynasty is now a few kilometres inland from the north shore of the Pearl River.
 Panshan Yunqi is now just an inconspicuous mound inside Sun Yat-sen Literature Library on Wende Lu. During its glorious days, the ancient Wen Creek flowed to its east. In the wet days, evaporated creek water would create a mist in the shade of pines and cotton trees. However, Wen Creek was rerouted away in 1467 to connect with Donghao Stream. With the loss of its water source, the scene gradually disappeared in the mid-late Ming dynasty.
 Yaozhou Chunxiao was an artificial islet in Xi Lake, a lake built from excavating a natural pool during the Southern Han dynasty. "Yaozhou" literally means "medicine islet". It was the place where Southern Han emperor Liu Yan gathered alchemists to produce medicine. Medicine was dumped into the water, dying the water into a unique scenery. Xi Lake was filled with earth after the Chenghua era in the Ming dynasty. Today, a garden on Jiaoyu Lu named Site of Yaozhou encloses the remains of the sight.
 Qilin Sujing referred to Xuanmiao Temple, which was known for its gardening in the Ming dynasty. In local legends, trees inside were planted by immortals. There was also a well which was said to be drilled by Su Shi. Thus the sight was named. The site of Xuanmiao Temple has since become a densely populated urban area. No trace of the sight can be found today.
 Zhujiang Qinglan was the same sight as Zhujiang Qiuse of the Song dynasty.
 Xiangshan Qiaoge
 Liwan Yuchang

Qing dynasty
Eight Views of the Ram City were chosen through public appraisal twice in the Qing dynasty. The first election was in the Qianlong era and the second was from the Tongzhi era to the Guangxu era.

Qianlong era
Quoted from Yangcheng Guchao.

 Wuxian Xiadong: Temple of the Five Immortals
 Pazhou Dizhu: Pazhou Pagoda
 Guwu Yushan: Academy on Yushan Mountain
 Zhenhai Cenglou: Zhenhai Tower
 Fuqiu Danjing: Fuqiu Reef
 Xiqiao Yunfu: Xiqiao Mountain
 Donghai Yuzhu: Yuzhu Reef
 Yuexiu Lianfeng: Yuexiu Mountain

Tongzhi and Guangxu eras
Quoted from Yuedong Biji.

 Shimen Fanzhao: Shimen and Small Beijiang River
 Boluo Yuri or Fuxu Yuri: Temple of Nanhai God, alternatively called Pineapple Temple.
 Zhujiang Yeyue or Haizhu Yeyue: Pearl River
 Jinshan Gusi: Lingzhou and Small Jinshan Mountain Temple
 Datong Yanyu: Datong Temple and Yanyu Well
 Baiyun Wanwang: Baiyun Temple
 Pujian Lianquan: Changpu Creek
 Jingtai Senggui: Jingtai Temple

1963
 Baiyun Songtao: Baiyun Mountain, Moxing Peak and Mingzhu Pagoda
 Luogang Xiangxue: Luogang Xiangxue Park, Luofeng Temple
 Yuexiu Yuantiao: Yuexiu Mountain, Zhenhai Tower, Sun Yat-sen Memorial Monument
 Zhuhai Danxin: Haizhu Square and its nearby scenic spots centering about Guangzhou Liberation Monument
 Hongling Xuri: Memorial Mausoleum to the Martyrs in Guangzhou Uprising, or Martyrs' Park as more commonly known
 Shuangqiao Yanyu: Zhujiang Bridge
 E'tan Yeyue: Bai'etan and Shamian Island
 Donghu Chunxiao: Dongshan Lake Park

1986
 Hongling Xuri: Memorial Mausoleum to the Martyrs in Guangzhou Uprising, or Martyrs' Park as more commonly known
 Huangpu Yunqiang: Huangpu Port and Xinsha Port
 Yunshan Jinxiu: Baiyun Mountain
 Zhuhai Qingbo: Haizhu Square
 Huanghua Haoqi: Mausoleum of 72 Martyrs at Huanghuagang, or Huanghuagang Park as more commonly known
 Yuexiu Cenglou: Zhenhai Tower
 Liuhua Yuyu: Buildings surrounding China Import And Export Fair (Canton Fair) Building (Liuhua Pavilion) and Guangzhou railway station
 Longdong Qilin: South China Botanical Garden

2002
The following are those chosen through public appraisal in 2001 and brought out in 2002.

 Yunshan Diecui: Baiyun Mountain
 Zhushui Yeyun: Pearl River
 Yuexiu Xinhui: Yuexiu Mountain
 Tianhe Piaojuan: CITIC Plaza and the artificial waterfall at Guangzhou East railway station square
 Guci Liufang: Chen Clan Academy and Guangdong Folk Craftwork Museum
 Huanghua Haoyue: Mausoleum of 72 Martyrs at Huanghuagang, or Huanghuagang Park as more commonly known
 Wuhuan Chenxi: Guangdong Olympic Stadium, or known as Aoti Main Stadium
 Lianfeng Guanhai: Panyu Lianhua Mountain

2011
The following are those chosen through public appraisal and brought out in 2011.

 Tayao Xincheng: Canton Tower, Chigang Pagoda, Haixinsha, Flower City Square, Guangzhou Twin Towers, CITIC Plaza, etc.
 Zhushui Liuguang: Pearl River (segment from Bai'etan to Pazhou), Wharves, Bai'etan, Shamian Island, Yanjiang Lu, Ersha Island, Haixinsha, Guangzhou Convention and Exhibition Center, etc.
 Yunshan Diecui: Baiyun Mountain, Yuntai Garden, etc.
 Yuexiu Fenghua: Yuexiu Mountain, Zhenhai Tower, Five Rams Statue, Sun Yat-sen Memorial Monument, etc.
 Guxi Liufang: Chen Clan Academy and Guangdong Folk Craftwork Museum
 Liwan Shengjing: Litchi Bay, Liwan Lake, Arcades on Enning Lu, Xiguan Residences, etc.
 Kecheng Jinxiu: Guangzhou Science City
 Shidi Changwan: Nansha Wetland Park

Gallery

See also
 Other Eight Views around China, Japan, &c.

Notes

Names in native languages

References

External links
 
 
 

 
Buildings and structures in Guangzhou